Josh Calloway (born February 3, 1979) is an American politician serving as a member of the Kentucky House of Representatives from the 10th district. Elected in November 2020, he assumed office on January 1, 2021.

Education 
Calloway earned a certification in health and safety from Eastern Kentucky University.

Career 
Prior to entering politics, he worked as a safety and security manager for National Office Furniture. He has since worked as a business development and safety officer for Protech EIS Corporation. He was elected to the Kentucky House of Representatives in November 2020, defeating incumbent Democrat Dean Schamore. He assumed office on January 1, 2021.

References 

1979 births
Living people
Eastern Kentucky University alumni
Republican Party members of the Kentucky House of Representatives
21st-century American politicians